Hammonds is a surname. Notable people with the surname include:

Alan Hammonds (born 1955), English singer-songwriter
Cliff Hammonds (born 1985), American basketball player
Evelynn M. Hammonds (born 1953), American academic
Graham Hammonds, British singer
Jeffrey Hammonds (born 1971), American baseball player
Rayshaun Hammonds (born 1998), American basketball player
Shelley Hammonds (born 1983), retired Australian basketball player
Tom Hammonds (born 1967), American basketball player and drag racer

See also
Hammond (surname)

English-language surnames
Surnames from given names